

The Richard 150 Commuter is an American two-seat cabin monoplane designed and built by The C.H. Richard Company of Lancaster, California to be sold in kit form or as plans for amateur construction.

Design and development
A development of the early Richard 125 Commuter flown in 1969, the 150 Commuter is a braced high-wing monoplane with all-metal construction of the wings, monocoque fuselage and tail unit. It has a non-retractable conventional landing gear with a tailwheel. The prototype was powered by a  Lycoming O-320-A2A air-cooled engine with a two-bladed metal tractor propeller. The enclosed cabin has two side-by-side seats with dual controls and a baggage space behind the seats.

Specifications (prototype with original wing)

References

Notes

Bibliography

1970s United States civil utility aircraft
High-wing aircraft
Single-engined tractor aircraft
150
Aircraft first flown in 1972